Arthur Mapp (born 6 November 1953) is a British former judoka who competed in the 1980 Summer Olympics.

Biography
Mapp, born in British Honduras came to prominence after winning the 1978 Swedish Open and 1978 British Open. In 1980, he was selected to represent Great Britain at the 1980 Olympic Games in Moscow, where he competed in the men's open category. He reached the semi finals before losing to the eventual gold medallist Dietmar Lorenz but Mapp won the repechage final against Dambajavyn Tsend–Ayuush to claim a bronze medal. At the time of his Olympic success, Arthur Mapp was serving with the British Army as a Corporal in the Royal Army Pay Corps.

In 1981, he became champion of Great Britain, winning the open division at the British Judo Championships.

References

1952 births
Living people
British male judoka
Olympic judoka of Great Britain
Judoka at the 1980 Summer Olympics
Olympic bronze medallists for Great Britain
Olympic medalists in judo
Belizean emigrants to the United Kingdom
Black British sportspeople
Medalists at the 1980 Summer Olympics
Royal Army Pay Corps soldiers